Khubani ka meetha or qubani ka meetha is an Indian dessert made from dried apricots. It is a part of Hyderabadi cuisine and is a common feature at Hyderabadi weddings.

History
Khubani or khobani (خوبانی) is Urdu for apricot; it is believed that apricots were introduced to India by Central Asians.

Ingredients
Dried apricots from Afghanistan are especially prized for their flavour. Khubani ka meetha is a very popular dessert of India's Hyderabadi cuisine.

Preparation of the dish involves boiling apricots with syrup until they assume the consistency of a thick soup or compote. The dessert is topped with blanched almonds or apricot kernels, and is traditionally garnished with malai (extra thick cream, ideally from buffalo milk), but also with custard or ice cream. The dessert is normally served hot with malai.

See also 
 Double ka meetha

References

External links
The history of Khubani ka meetha
Recipe for Khubani ka Meetha

Indian desserts
Indian cuisine
Hyderabadi cuisine
Telangana cuisine
Fruit dishes